In 2019 Kent County Cricket Club competed in Division One of the County Championship after gaining promotion in the 2018 season, the Royal London One-Day Cup and the 2019 t20 Blast.

The season was the third in charge for head coach, and former player, Matthew Walker. Sam Billings retained the club captaincy that he was first awarded in 2018. With Billings and vice-captain Joe Denly playing in the Indian Premier League, which ran until 5 May, Heino Kuhn was announced as interim captain for the early part of the season. Following an injury to Billings in April, Denly and Kuhn captained the side during the first half of the season, with Kuhn standing in as captain in June and July to allow Denly to focus on his batting following a period of poor form.

Squad

Departures
At the end of the 2018 season, and after an 18-year career with Kent, former England off-spinner James Tredwell announced his retirement from cricket. Tredwell represented England in two Tests, 45 One Day Internationals and 17 T20 Internationals. Will Gidman and Matt Hunn also retired from professional cricket when their contracts expired.

Spin bowler Adam Riley left the club by "mutual consent" in June, having played four matches during the season. Riley had joined the club in 2011 and made over 100 appearances for Kent. Veteran all-rounder Darren Stevens was loaned out to Derbyshire for the T20 Blast competition in July. Stevens, who had not played for Kent in the 2018 Blast, was not part of the county's plans for the competition but wanted to play T20 cricket during the season with an eye to maintaining his fitness if required by Kent.

In July, it was reported that 43 year-old all-rounder Darren Stevens would not be offered a new contract after the 2019 season. However, after a string of strong performances featuring a sequence of 445 runs and 34 wickets in five championship matches, including a ten-wicket match haul against Nottinghamshire and a career high score of 237 against Yorkshire, the club made a u-turn and Stevens signed an extension.

In September, the club announced that seamer Mitchell Claydon would be leaving after seven years at the end of the season to join Sussex.

Arrivals
In September 2018, Kent announced the signing of 24 year-old seam bowler Matt Milnes from Nottinghamshire on a three-year deal beginning at the start of the 2019 season. Milnes had played only eight first-class matches, making his Nottinghamshire debut in June, and previously having played for Durham MCCU. On 1 October 2018, Kent announced another signing for the 2019 season with Dutch international left-arm fast bowler Fred Klaassen joining on a two-year contract. In October, Kent awarded a first professional contract to academy graduate wicketkeeper-batsman Jordan Cox.

In February, Kent announced the signing of English-born Australian international batsman Matt Renshaw as their overseas player for the early part of the season, making him available for the opening three County Championship matches and the entire Royal London One-Day Cup campaign. New Zealand fast bowler Adam Milne re-signed to play for the county in the T20 Blast later the same month and Afghanistan's veteran all-rounder Mohammad Nabi was also signed for the first 11 matches of the competition.

In May, Kent announced that Wiaan Mulder had signed with the county as the overseas player for seven County Championship matches. The South African all-rounder replaced Matt Renshaw after his stint ended in the middle of May, although he was only able to play in three matches before being recalled by South Africa to rest a foot injury ahead of their tour of India. On 5 June, Kent announced that South African fast bowler Hardus Viljoen was to rejoin the club for a second spell to play in the T20 Blast. Viljoen previously had a short spell with Kent at the end of the 2016 season and rejoins as a Kolpak signing. On 7 June, Middlesex off-spinner Ollie Rayner joined the county on loan for the last eight County Championship matches of the season and on 6 August Academy graduate Marcus O'Riordan signed his first professional contract, initially for the remainder of the season. On 25 August, Kent announced the signing of South Africa captain Faf du Plessis for their remaining two group matches of the T20 Blast, replacing the departed Mohammad Nabi. It was later announced that du Plessis would also play in the County Championship match against Yorkshire at Headingley, providing him with some first-class preparation prior to captaining South Africa in their Test series against India.

Also in August, Kent announced that they had signed Yorkshire all-rounder Jack Leaning on a three-year contract from October 2019. During their last game of the season, Kent announced the signing of teenage Afghan-born England Under-19 off-spinner Hamidullah Qadri on a three-year deal from the 2020 season. Shortly after the same match, Kent announced the signing of 35 year-old seamer Tim Groenewald from Somerset on a two-year deal from 2020.

Squad list
 Ages given as of the first day of the 2019 County Championship season, 5 April 2019.

County Championship
The season is Kent's first in Division One of the County Championship since 2010. They will play 14 matches, playing each of the seven other teams in the division twice, once at home and once away. Five of the county's home matches will be staged at the St Lawrence Ground, with one match at each of the Nevill Ground in Tunbridge Wells and County Cricket Ground, Beckenham.

Kent's first match of the season began on 5 April against Somerset at Taunton, although the whole of the first day was lost to rain and a wet outfield.

Division One

Matches

Other first-class match
Kent began the season with a three-day first-class match against Loughborough MCC University on 31 March as part of the 2019 Marylebone Cricket Club University Matches. With Joe Denly and Sam Billings away at the IPL and interim captain Heino Kuhn not in the side, Daniel Bell-Drummond stood in as captain for this match. Fred Klaassen and Matt Milnes made their Kent debuts in the match which was drawn after much of the final day was lost to rain. Sean Dickson scored Kent's first century of the season, with a score of 108 not out in the county's first innings.

Royal London One-Day Cup
Kent played eight matches in the South Group in the 2019 Royal London One-Day Cup, winning only two matches in a competition that they had reached the final of in 2018. Four losses and an abandoned match at Cardiff to start the competition effectively knocked the county out of the knock-out stages before two wins against Surrey and Essex led to a seventh-place finish in the group.

The campaign saw maiden List A centuries for Matt Renshaw and Zak Crawley as well as a century for Daniel Bell-Drummond whilst bowler Matt Milnes took his first professional five wicket haul in Kent's first match of the competition, his List A debut. In April former England and Warwickshire batsman Jonathan Trott was announced as an additional coach for Kent's  campaign.

South group

Matches

Other List A match
Kent hosted a 50-over match against the touring Pakistan national side ahead of their One Day International series against England. Due to a number of injuries and other availability issues affecting a significant number of players, Kent were given permission by the ECB to include two guest players for this fixture. Middlesex seamer James Harris (who had previously had a loan spell with Kent during the 2017 season) and Essex's Dutch international seamer Shane Snater were both named in the team. Academy graduate Jordan Cox was also selected for his first senior appearance. Adam Rouse stood in as captain.

Vitality Blast

South group

Matches

Statistics

Batting

Source: Cricinfo

Source: CricInfo

Source: CricInfo

Bowling

Source: CricInfo

Source: CricInfo

Source: CricInfo

References

External links
Kent home at ESPN cricinfo
Kent County Cricket Club official site

2019
2019 in English cricket